Norman Edwards (24 September 1962 – 11–12 July 2015) was a Jamaican sprinter. He competed in the men's 100 metres at the 1984 Summer Olympics.

References

1962 births
2015 deaths
Athletes (track and field) at the 1984 Summer Olympics
Jamaican male sprinters
Olympic athletes of Jamaica